The following is a list of members of the Estonian Constituent Assembly (Asutav Kogu) of 1919–20. The Russian Provisional Government created the Autonomous Governorate of Estonia in April 1917 and decreed that it should have its own governor and an elected Provincial Assembly, which convened in July 1917. On 28 November that year, it declared its laws sovereign over Estonia, but the Bolsheviks led by Jaan Anvelt occupied Tallinn (Estonia's capital) and declared the Provincial Assembly dissolved; as they retreated in February 1918, the Estonian Salvation Committee issued the Estonian Declaration of Independence. Soon afterwards, however, German forces occupied Estonia, a situation made formal under the Treaty of Brest-Litovsk; after Germany's withdrawal at the end of the First World War in November 1918, a Provisional Government proclaimed independence, but the Soviet Russian Red Army occupied Estonia shortly afterwards, triggering the Estonian War of Independence. Only once the Red Army had been expelled from the region in February 1919 could the Provincial Assembly (still technically sitting) establish a Constituent Assembly "to lay the foundations for Estonian statehood [and] to adopt the Constitution". The Assembly sat between 23 April 1919 and 20 December 1920, following elections held on 5–7 April 1919. It ratified the 1st Constitution of Estonia which provided for a new legislative chamber: the Riigikogu.

List of members 
Source: Jaan Toomla, Valitud ja Valitsenud: Eesti parlamentaarsete ja muude esinduskogude ning valitsuste isikkoosseis aastail 1917–1999 (National Library of Estonia, 1999), pp. 25–32.

References 

Lists of political office-holders in Estonia